Keith Tellus Browner, Jr. (born April 7, 1988) is an American football defensive end who is currently a free agent. He signed with Houston Texans in 2012 and Chicago Bears in 2016. He played college football at University of California, Berkeley.

High school years
Browner Jr. attended Dorsey High School in Los Angeles, California. Browner Jr. was selected to the SuperPrep All-Far West team. Browner Jr. was ranked as the No. 22 prospect among defensive ends and also was ranked as the 78th prospect among defensive ends in the state of California according to Rivals.com. He was ranked as the 44th defensive end by scout.com.

College career
He played college football at California. He finished college with 37 tackles, 4 Sacks, 4 pass deflection and 2 forced fumbles.

Professional career

Houston Texans
In 2012, Browner Jr. signed with the Houston Texans. On August 31, he was released. On October 29, 2012, he was signed to the practice squad. He was signed to the 53-man active squad of the Houston Texans on December 12, 2014. He was released from the Houston Texans on May 15, 2015.

Chicago Bears
Browner signed a futures contract with the Chicago Bears on January 11, 2016. On August 28, 2016, Browner was waived by the Bears.

Personal life
He is the son of former NFL linebacker Keith Browner and the nephew of former NFL defensive end Ross Browner and former six time Pro Bowl safety Joey Browner who played for the Minnesota Vikings from 1983-1991 and the Tampa Bay Buccaneers in 1992. He is the cousin of Pittsburgh Steelers Offensive tackle Max Starks. Keith founded a nonprofit organization, Kreating the Dream Living Beyond Foundation that is geared towards mentoring minority youth males being raised in a female head-of-household environment.

References

External links
 California Golden Bears bio
 Houston Texans bio

1988 births
Living people
American football defensive ends
California Golden Bears football players
Houston Texans players
Chicago Bears players
Players of American football from Tampa, Florida
Players of American football from Los Angeles
Susan Miller Dorsey High School alumni